is a passenger railway station in located in the city of Wakayama, Wakayama Prefecture, Japan, operated by West Japan Railway Company (JR West).

Lines

Station layout
The station consists of two opposed side platforms connected by an elevated station building. The station is staffed.

Platforms

Adjacent stations

|-
!colspan=5|West Japan Railway Company (JR West)

History
Kimiidera Station opened on February 28, 1924. With the privatization of the Japan National Railways (JNR) on April 1, 1987, the station came under the aegis of the West Japan Railway Company. The current station building was completed in September 2004.

Passenger statistics
In fiscal 2019, the station was used by an average of 2120 passengers daily (boarding passengers only).

Surrounding Area
 Kimii-dera 
 Kimiidera Park
 Kimiidera Athletic Stadium
 Kimiidera Baseball Stadium
 Wakayama Medical University

 l

See also
List of railway stations in Japan

References

External links

 Kimiidera Station Official Site

Railway stations in Wakayama Prefecture
Railway stations in Japan opened in 1924
Wakayama (city)